Piz Griatschouls is a mountain of the Albula Alps, located north of Zuoz in the canton of Graubünden. It lies east of Piz Val Müra, on the range between the Val Viluoch and the main Inn valley.

References

External links
 Piz Griatschouls on Hikr

Mountains of the Alps
Mountains of Graubünden
Mountains of Switzerland
Two-thousanders of Switzerland
Zuoz